Still-Life with Fruits (French - Nature morte aux fruits) is a series of still life paintings produced between 1871 and 1872 by Gustave Courbet, marking his return to painting after the silence forced on him by the Franco-Prussian War, the Paris Commune, imprisonment and illness.

List

References

Still life paintings
Paintings by Gustave Courbet
1871 paintings
1872 paintings
Paintings in the United States
Paintings in the collection of the Ny Carlsberg Glyptotek
Collections of the National Gallery, London
Paintings in the collection of the Musée d'Orsay
Collection of the Neue Pinakothek